Babinek refers to the following places in Poland:

 Babinek, Gryfino County
 Babinek, Pyrzyce County